The Society of Merchant Venturers is a charitable organisation in the English city of Bristol.

The society can be traced back to a 13th-century guild which funded the voyage of John Cabot to Canada. In 1552, it gained a monopoly on sea trading from Bristol from its first royal charter. For centuries it had almost been synonymous with the government of Bristol, especially Bristol Harbour. In recent times, the society's activities have centred on charitable agendas.

The society played a part in the development of Bristol, including the building of Clifton Suspension Bridge and the Great Western Railway. It also influenced the development of educational institutions in Greater Bristol, including University of Bristol, University of the West of England, University of Bath, City of Bristol College, Merchants' Academy, Montpelier High School and Wells Cathedral School.

History
A Guild of Merchants was founded in Bristol by the 13th century, and swiftly became active in civic life. It funded John Cabot's voyage of discovery to Newfoundland in 1497. The society in its current form was established by a 1552 Royal Charter from Edward VI granting the society a monopoly on Bristol's sea trade. The society remained in effective control of Bristol's harbour until 1809. Further charters were granted by Charles I, Charles II and Elizabeth II. The society's members were active in the English colonisation of North America, helping to establish the Bristol's Hope and Cuper's Cove settlements in Newfoundland.

From the accession of William III in 1689, the society promoted trade protectionism which resulted in Parliament enacting policies such as restricting exports from Ireland and banning imports into Ireland from anywhere except England 'with deplorable results'.

In 1698 the society successfully lobbied Parliament to open up the slave trade to all subjects of the Crown. Over the next fifty years, the society joined with the City Corporation and Bristol MPs in fighting numerous attempts to restore London's monopoly. Joseph Harford, a member of the society who would go on to become Master in 1796, was both a banker and a brass manufacturer, and thus a beneficiary of the trade. He was also the first chairman in 1788 of Bristol's provincial committee for the abolition of slavery, when opinion was becoming more divided.

During the eighteenth century one quarter of the individual members of the society were directly involved in the slave trade, including Michael Becher, Edward Colston, John Duckenfield, and Isaac Hobhouse.

The first light on the island of Flat Holm was a simple brazier mounted on a wooden frame, which stood on the high eastern part of the island. In 1733 the Society of Merchant Venturers of Bristol found the brazier to be unreliable and petitioned the general lighthouse authority, Trinity House, for an actual lighthouse, but the petition failed. In 1735 Mr. William Crispe of Bristol submitted a proposal to build a lighthouse at his own expense. This initial proposal also failed but negotiations resumed in 1736 when 60 soldiers drowned after their vessel crashed on the Wolves rocks near Flat Holm. Following this disaster, the Society of Merchant Venturers supported William Crispe's proposal. Crispe agreed to pay £800 (£110,552, $220,241 in 2008) for the construction of the tower as well as the fees permits. The construction of the tower finished in 1737 and it began operating on 25 March 1738.

The costs of the construction of Bristol's Floating Harbour, completed in 1809, were far beyond the limited resources of the society and necessitated the setting up of the Bristol Docks Company. Although the society was represented on the board, it ceded its role in the management of the port of Bristol, which had dominated its activities throughout the seventeenth and eighteenth centuries.

In the 19th century the society helped to fund the building of Clifton Suspension Bridge and members of the society helped to establish the Great Western Railway. In the 1860s the society acted with the Bristol Corporation to put Clifton Down and the adjoining Durdham Down under the control of a single Downs Committee. The society's members wanted to protect the land from future development and ensure that it remained available to the people of the city. The creation of the Downs Act in 1861 brought together Clifton Down with Durdham Down, setting out a long-term partnership to protect this open green space. Representatives from Bristol City Council and members of the society form the Downs Committee which meets regularly to ensure that the Downs is maintained and improved for the long term. Alderman Proctor's Drinking Fountain on Clifton Down was built in 1872 by G. and H. Godwin in a Gothic Revival style to commemorate the society's presentation in 1861 of "certain rights over Clifton Down made to the citizens" of Bristol.

The society contributed a total sum of £26 towards the construction of the statue of Edward Colston, which was completed in 1895 – 170 years after Colston's death. With growing awareness in the late 20th century of his involvement in the Bristol slave trade, there were protests and petitions for changes to institutions named after Colston, alterations to the statue's plaque, or for the statue to be removed, culminating in June 2020, when the statue was toppled and dumped in Bristol Harbour by Black Lives Matter protesters. After the statue was toppled, the Merchant Venturers issued a statement claiming that it had been "inappropriate" for them to have become involved in the rewording of the plaque in 2018.

In the sixteenth century the society had maintained a free school for mariners' children under the Merchants' Hall in King Street. A century later sailors were being instructed in the 'Arte of Navigacion'. This was to evolve into the Merchant Venturers' Technical College in Unity Street towards the end of the nineteenth century when over 2,500 students were enrolled. When University College, Bristol achieved its charter as the University of Bristol in 1909, the Merchant Venturers' Technical College provided the faculty of engineering, whilst the remaining departments of the college eventually became the University of the West of England. At the beginning of the eighteenth century the society took on Edward Colston's 'Colston's Hospital', a school for 100 boys (now Colston's School). This moved to Stapleton in 1861, becoming co-educational in 1991. In 1891 Colston's Girls' School (now Montpelier High School) was opened on Cheltenham Road using funds from Edward Colston's endowment. It became an academy in 2008, when Withywood School reopened as Merchants' Academy. In 2016 the Bristol Autism Free School, now called Venturers' Academy, opened nearby. Since 2017 the society and the University of Bristol have jointly sponsored five primary schools, a secondary school, an all-through school and a special school in Bristol. The overarching Venturers' Trust now oversees the education of more than 3,200 students.

The Merchant Venturers cared for twelve poor mariners in the sixteenth century and the society continues to be involved with the care for older people. The society has managed Colstons Almshouses on St Michael's Hill since its foundation by Edward Colston in 1696. Since 1922 the society has been the endowment trustee for the independent charity, the St Monica Trust, enabling very substantial developments to accommodate older people in recent years. The Society has also been sole trustee of the Cote Charity, set up in 1968, which in 2009 opened Katherine House, a residential care home and in 2016, Griffiths House for those living with dementia.

Involvement in the slave trade

The society was an active participant in the transatlantic slave trade from the seventeenth century until the eighteenth century.

Edward Colston's membership
The organisation says that Edward Colston became a member of the slave trading Royal African Company in 1680 and joined the society in 1683, continuing to live in London and attending two meetings.

Archives
Records of the Society of Merchant Venturers including foundation and membership, administrative, financial, charities, education, estates management, trade, associated clubs and societies, the Seamen's Hospital Fund, and various name indexes are held at Bristol Archives (Ref. SMV) (online catalogue) as well as further papers and correspondence related to the Society of Merchant Venturers' interests (Ref. 12152) (online catalogue). Other deeds and estate papers related to the society's interests in Somerset and Dorset are available at Somerset Heritage Centre.

Current status
The Society of Merchant Venturers comprises men and women who volunteer their skills and expertise to support the organisation's objectives.
The Merchant Venturers work closely with the wider community and many of its members play a role in Bristol's commercial life and the institutions within the city. Its objectives are to:
 Contribute to the prosperity and well-being of the greater Bristol area through active support of enterprise and commercial and community activity;
 Enhance the quality of life for all, particularly for the young, aged and disadvantaged;
 Promote learning and the acquisition of skills by supporting education;
 Act as effective stewards of the charitable trusts, heritage, ancient buildings and open spaces for which the society is responsible.

Criticisms

According to an article in local magazine Venue in 2002, many members were not active in charity.  However, the society says that the qualification for potential members is being "prominent in their own sphere of business and active in the charitable or public life of the area". There were no female full members of the society until 2003 (though Margaret Thatcher had earlier been made an honorary member), and no ethnic minority members until 2017 when Mohammed Saddiq, executive director of Wessex Water, was appointed; followed by Marti Burgess in 2020, a partner at Bevan Brittan.

Venue said that the Merchant Venturers control 12 charities and 40 trust funds, and also a private unlimited company, SMV Investments, that has major investments in defence contracting, tobacco, genetically modified agriculture and the petroleum industry. Merchant Venturers serve on the boards of many local charitable and cultural organisations, and are guaranteed seats on the University of Bristol Court and the Downs Committee. It quotes Paul Burton of the university's School of Policy Studies as saying, "they exert quite a bit of influence and we, the people of Bristol, don't know much about them and can't hold them to account".

In January 2022 Thangam Debbonaire, the MP for Bristol West whose constituency includes the Merchants’ headquarters in Clifton, told the Bristol Post that she believed it was time for the society to disband, calling them an "unaccountable, undemocratic network with no place in a modern, multicultural Bristol".

Statue of Edward Colston
On 7 June 2020, during international Black Lives Matter demonstrations provoked by the murder of George Floyd, a group of protestors in Bristol pulled down the 1895 statue of Edward Colston that stood in Magpie Park in The Centre, Bristol, objecting to the veneration of Edward Colston, a slave-trader, and pushed it into the harbour. During ensuing debate over the legitimacy of this act, the Society of Merchant Venturers was accused of having used its influence to block previous attempts to remove the statue legally. In response to the statue's removal, a spokesperson for the Merchant Venturers promised the society would "continue to educate itself about systemic racism".

Heraldry

The company's arms are blazoned as follows:

Arms: Barry wavy of eight argent and azure, on a bend or, a dragon passant with wings indorsed and tail extended vert, on achief gules, a lion passant guardant of the third, between two bezants. Crest: In a ducal coronet or, a main-mast of the last with pennon flying argent, charged with a cross gules, on the round top a man in armour proper, on his dexter arm a truncheon, his sinister hand supporting a carved shield of the second, from the round top six pike staves, three on each side issuing bendways of the first, the rigging from the round top to the coronet sable. Supporters: The dexter, a mermaid in the sea, all proper crined or, the middle fins at the joining of the bodies of the last, holding in her sinister hand a mirror of the first, and supporting with her dexter hand an anchor of the second, cabled proper: the sinister supporter, a winged satyr proper standing on a mount vert, winged and legged or, holding in his sinister hand a scythe the blade in base, all proper. Motto: Indocilis pauperiem pati.

The motto  (Will not learn to endure poverty) is from the Odes of Horace.

See also 
 Merchant Venturers Almshouses
 The Merchant Venturer, passenger train from London to Bristol and Weston-super-Mare, running from 1951 to 1961
Notable present and past members in the category Members of the Society of Merchant Venturers

References

Further reading
 
 
 
 
 
 
 
 
 

Discovery of a L16 Advance Sheds Light on John Cabots Adventures http://www.nytimes.com/2012/06/19/science/john-cabot-italian-bankers-and-the-new-world.html

External links
Society of Merchant Venturers- official site

Organisations based in Bristol
Economic history of England
Chartered companies
13th-century establishments in England
History of Bristol